A United States Air Force airborne air control squadron is an airborne unit which provides combat air control services in the form of radar, surveillance identification, weapons control, Battle Management and theater communications data link to the forces or area it is assigned to. This list contains squadrons inactive, active, and historical.

List

See also
List of United States Air Force squadrons

Airborne Air Control